Peter Gabriel Revisited is a compilation album by Peter Gabriel which includes selections from his first two albums, as Atlantic had retained the US distribution rights to Gabriel's first and second albums. It compiles 7 of 9 tracks from the first album, and 8 of 11 from the second. Allmusic, noting that the compilation ill-served both committed and casual Gabriel fans, labelled this album "good but useless".

Track listing
All songs written by Peter Gabriel, except where indicated.
 "On the Air" – 5:28
 "Modern Love" – 3:38
 "Indigo" – 3:32
 "Solsbury Hill" – 4:20
 "Perspective" – 3:28
 "Waiting for the Big One" – 7:14
 "Animal Magic" – 3:29
 "Humdrum" – 3:26
 "D.I.Y." – 2:38
 "Mother of Violence" (Gabriel, Jill Gabriel) – 3:21
 "Slowburn" – 4:36
 "Exposure" (Gabriel, Robert Fripp) – 4:17
 "Moribund the Burgermeister" – 4:17
 "Flotsam and Jetsam" – 2:22
 "Here Comes the Flood" – 5:54

Personnel
 Peter Gabriel – synthesizer, flute, piano, keyboards, recorder, vocals, background vocals 
 Bayete – keyboards
 Roy Bittan – keyboards
 Josef Chirowski – synthesizer, percussion, keyboards
 Larry Fast – synthesizer
 Robert Fripp – banjo, electric guitar, producer, classical guitar, frippertronics
 Dick Wagner – guitar, background vocals
 Steve Hunter – guitar, pedal steel, rhythm guitar
 Sid McGinnis – acoustic guitar, mandolin, electric guitar, steel guitar, background vocals
 Tony Levin – bass, tuba, arranger, background vocals, chapman stick, recorder arrangement
 George Marge – recorder
 Jerry Marotta – drums, background vocals
 Allan Schwartzberg – drums
 Tim Capello – saxophone

Credits
 Val Azzoli – executive producer
 Tom Bouman – art direction, design
 Bob Ezrin – producer
 Stephen Innocenzi – remastering
 Ron Jaramillo – design
 Bob Kaus – compilation
 Michael Mazzarella – research coordination

References

External links
 
 Peter Gabriel Revisited at ProgArchives.com

Peter Gabriel albums
Albums produced by Bob Ezrin
Albums produced by Robert Fripp
1992 compilation albums
Atlantic Records compilation albums